John Gummere (1784-1845) was an American astronomer and one of the founders of Haverford College in Pennsylvania. He was born in 1784 near Willow Grove, Pennsylvania. His son Samuel James Gummere (1811-1874) was the first president of Haverford College, and his grandson Francis Barton Gummere (1855-1919) was an influential scholar of folklore and ancient languages and an alumnus of Haverford College.

In 1814, Gummere was elected as a member of the American Philosophical Society.

Gummere built the first observatory at Haverford College (erected about 1834), now commemorated by a plaque at its original location, after being replaced by the Strawbridge Observatory in 1850.

Bibliography
 Practical Astronomy, 1812
 Mathematical Tables, 1822
 A Treatise on Surveying, 1822
 An Elementary Treatise on Astronomy, 1842

References

External links
 Works by John Gummere at Online Books, UPenn.

American astronomers
American Quakers
1784 births
1845 deaths
Haverford College faculty